Phasor is a stereo music, sound and speech synthesizer created by Applied Engineering for the Apple II family of computers.  Consisting of a sound card and a set of related software, the Phasor system was designed to be compatible with most software written for other contemporary Apple II cards, including the Sweet Micro Systems Mockingboard, ALF's Apple Music Synthesizer, Echo+ and Applied Engineering's earlier card Super Music Synthesizer.

References

Notes
Phasor Manual

External links
Applied Engineering 1986 Summer/Fall Catalog. Phasor appears on page 12
Applied Engineering 1987 Summer/Fall Catalog. Phasor appears on page 17
Applied Engineering 1988 Spring/Summer Catalog. Phasor appears on page 23
Applied Engineering 1989 Winter/Spring Catalog. Phasor appears on page 22
Wiki for Reactive Micro's modern reproductions

Apple II peripherals
Apple II software
Sound cards
Speech synthesis